The William F. Mangels Four-Row Carousel, formerly located in southwest Portland, Oregon, is listed on the National Register of Historic Places.

See also
 National Register of Historic Places listings in Southwest Portland, Oregon

References

1914 establishments in Oregon
Amusement rides introduced in 1914
Carousels on the National Register of Historic Places in Oregon
National Register of Historic Places in Portland, Oregon
Southwest Portland, Oregon